Malin Byström (born 3 September 1973) is a Swedish lyric soprano who has sung leading roles at many of the world's most prestigious opera houses.

Early life and education
Byström was born in Helsingborg. She studied at the Academy of Music and Drama, University of Gothenburg for four years and then trained as a soprano at Operahögskolan i Stockholm (University College of Opera, Stockholm).

Career
She debuted at The Royal Opera as Amalia in I masnadieri in 2002 and has since sung Marguerite in Faust, Fiordiligi in Così fan tutte, and Donna Anna in Don Giovanni.

Byström has also appeared with the Bavarian State Opera, Munich and the Metropolitan Opera, New York. She has sung at the Salzburg Festival and the Aix-en-Provence Festival. Her opera debut in Sweden was not until autumn  2007, when she sang Marguerite in Gounod's Faust with the Gothenburg Opera.

In 2014, she sang the title role in Richard Strauss's Arabella, with the New York Times remarking that her voice "has silvery plush" and describing her as "elegant in both looks and tone, and sounding full and flexible...uncannily reminiscent of Kiri Te Kanawa".

Her repertoire includes the title role in Massenet's Thaïs, which she has sung at Palau de les Arts, Valencia, opposite Plácido Domingo, as well as three Mozart roles with Fiordiligi in Così fan tutte, the Countess in The Marriage of Figaro, Donna Anna in Don Giovanni, and Amelia in Verdi's Simon Boccanegra.

In 2012, Opera News in their review of Thaïs in Valencia wrote, A svelte blonde beauty with the figure of a dancer, Byström is a consummate actress, who made the character's passage from sinner to saint fluid and believable. She commands a pristine soprano of distinctive color and strength. Her top register still needs developing, but in this most difficult character, Byström showed considerable promise and proved a worthy partner to the formidable Domingo.

Honours and awards
Byström received a Jenny Lind scholarship in 1997, and a Birgit Nilsson scholarship in 2008. She was awarded the title Hovsångerska, or Court Singer, by the King of Sweden in 2018.

Personal life
She is married to the Swedish baritone . They live in Gothenburg and have two children.

References

External links
 Malin Byström, Ann Braathen Artist Management.
 Malin Byström, the Royal Swedish Opera.

1973 births
Living people
Swedish operatic sopranos
People from Helsingborg
University of Gothenburg alumni
21st-century Swedish women opera singers